1981 year
}}
Kurgan Wheel Tractor Plant named after D. Karbyshev (JSC "Rusich", Russian: Курганский завод колёсных тягачей имени Д. М. Карбышева (ОАО «Русич»)) was a manufacturer of special heavy automotive machines since 1950 located in Kurgan, Kurgan Oblast.

Automobiles produced by the plant, special chassis, truck tractors and semi-trailers are used in the Ministry of Defence (Russia) system, also by oil and gas producing companies. In addition, heavy-duty ballast tractors are used for aerodrome-towing aircraft weighing up to 200 tonnes.

On March 4, 2010, the factory was declared bankrupt by Arbitral Court of Kurgan Oblast.

History 

The plant was founded on April 1, 1950 in Kurgan based on existing since 1941 enterprise Uralselmash and manufactured balers, harrows, silage choppers, threshers, etc. In the second half of the 1950s due to the increased demand of the national economy in heavy machines the plant was repurposed to produce wheel tractors. It was renamed Kurgan Wheel Tractor Plant (KZKT) by the Order of the Minister of automotive and tractor industry from June 11, 1966.

In the 1970s and 80s it employed about 11,000 people, there were specialists of 219 professions. Pride of the collective was Hero of Socialist Labor Yuri Nabatnikov. Mass edition factory newspaper "Factory life" was issued. KZKT had Palace of Culture, Sports Palace, Stadium and "Dolphin" swimming pool.

In 1981 the plant was awarded the Order of the Red Banner of Labor.

On July 10, 1993 JSC "Rusich" — "D.M. Karbyshev Kurgan Wheel Tractor Plant" was registered.
The volume of government procurement in 1991 dropped from 91% down to a level of 4.5%. Due to the lack of funds oil and gas companies rejected ordered vehicles, resulting in 286 unsold vehicles accumulated in warehouses. The volume of production in 1993 decreased by 34.2%.

Activities, products and services 
Activity: KZKT 8×8 automobile-tractors, full mass of a towing semi-trailer up to 100 tonnes, ballast tractors for towing trailers weighing up to 80 tonnes and aircraft weighing up to 200 tons; semi-trailers for transporting loads up to 80 tonnes, differential for UAZ cars.

Goods and Services: trucks and tractors, lorries, tractors for semi-trailers, trailers for trucks and tractors, road semi-trailers, Machine elements, components and spare parts for transmissions of automobiles and motor vehicles, Differential devices and components of automobiles and motor vehicles, Airport and aerodrome equipment, ground aircraft-towing vehicles for airports (tugs).

The plant had its own foundry.

Bankruptcy 
In the post-Soviet period, the company repeatedly changed owners several times and had undergone the bankruptcy procedure several times.

Back in 2010 the Arbitral Court of Kurgan Oblast received a statement from OAO "EnergoKurgan" that demanded recognition of the financial bankruptcy of JSC "Rusich" — "D.M. Karbyshev Kurgan Wheel Tractor Plant". A court decision from February 24, 2010 concerning JSC "Rusich" — KZKT appointed external supervision for a period of 18 months, Alexander Maslakov was approved as the external manager. External manager came to the conclusion that it was impossible to fulfill the external supervision plan before the deadline set by a court decision. In this regard, on March 17, 2011 Alexander Maslakov appealed to the Arbitral Court for early termination of external supervision procedures and the transition to bankruptcy proceedings. On April 28, 2011 the Arbitral Court of Kurgan Oblast declared JSC "Rusich" — "D.M. Karbyshev Kurgan Wheel Tractor Plant" bankrupt. According to external supervision plan, a portion of the property was to be sold through public auction.

As a result of the auction, organized by LLC "YuKO", winning bidders in the sale of lots were recognized as follows:
 Limited Liability Company "Group ESE" (300,965,412.96 rubles)
 Limited Liability Company "Titan" (98,019,002.10 rubles)
 Andrey Demin (38,916,483.40 rubles)
 Limited Liability Company "The Foundry" (24,203,145.17 rubles)
 Limited Liability Company "Leasing Invest" (18,500,500.80 rubles)
 Open Joint Stock Company "Kurgan Generation Company" (12,626,000.00 rubles)
 Cassina Julia Vitalievna (11,487,600.00 rubles)
 Limited Liability Company "Wave - ZHILSERVIS number 4" (6,768,000.00 rubles)
 SP Gennady Polikarpov (3,776,400.00 rubles)
 Pazderin Pavel V. (1,400,700.00 rubles)
 SP R. Roman O. (1,213,800.00 rubles)
 Limited Liability Company "Uralmetsnab" (1,009,800.00 rubles)

Products 

 BTR-60
 MAZ-535 (1961-1963) 
 Tractor MAZ-537 (1963-1990)
 Tractor KZKT-545
 Tractor KZKT-7428 "Rusich" (1990-2011, developed by the Plant Design Bureau)
 Special wheeled chassis KZKT-8005 (1990s–2011)

Administration 
Factory directors were:
 1950-1952 A.D. Sabel'nikov
 1952-1961 Konov A.I.
 1961-1971 Ketov, George Martiyanovich
 1971-1984 Kondratyev, Grigory
 1984-1986 Belozerov, Leonid G.
 1986-1989 Pavlov, Pavel
 1989-1995 Nechaev, Vladimir V.
 1996 since Cherva, Boris Maksimovic

external manager 
 Maslakov, Alexander

Director of "KZKT" 
 From February to March 2008 Tyazhelnikov, Vyacheslav
 From February 2010 Zamyatkin, Yuri

Director of "Forge Factory" Rusich "
 From March 2008 to February 2010 Tyazhelnikov, Vyacheslav

References

Literature 
 A.S. Sevost'yanov. "The "Hurricanes" are born here" - Chelyabinsk, 1985 (А.С. Севостьянов «Здесь рождаются «Ураганы» — Челябинск, 1985)

Defunct motor vehicle manufacturers of Russia
Truck manufacturers of the Soviet Union
Companies based in Kurgan, Kurgan Oblast
Defence companies of the Soviet Union